Harikrishnans is a 1998 Indian Malayalam-language romantic comedy film written and directed by Fazil. The film was produced and distributed by Suchitra Mohanlal under the production company Pranavam Arts, starring Mammootty and Mohanlal in the title roles. Juhi Chawla, Innocent, Shamili, Nedumudi Venu, Cochin Haneefa, Jagadish, Maniyanpilla Raju and Kunchacko Boban play the supporting cast. The film received a great pre-release hype due to the combined screen presence of Mohanlal and Mammootty, and was the highest-grossing Malayalam film of the year. It was later dubbed into Tamil with the same name.

The film initially had two endings when released, where the heroine chose Mammootty in one version, and Mohanlal in the other one. This was an attempt by the filmmakers to satisfy the fanbases of both Mammootty and Mohanlal, who were each popular in different regions of Kerala. However, only the Mohanlal version was submitted to the Central Board of Film Certification (CBFC) for censorship approval, and after both versions were released in theatres, the board sent a notice to the producer warning that it would take legal action, unless the ending with Mammootty, which had not been certified, was withdrawn. The producers were embroiled in legal actions after that, but the gimmick helped the film to bring in millions of rupees. This was an upturn for the Malayalam film industry, which had been generating unsuccessful films for quite some time.

Plot
The Harikrishnans are of the most famous lawyer duos in India. To avoid confusion one is called as Hari and the other as Krishnan. They head the organization called Harikrishnan Associates, which consists of around 300 lawyers. They get engaged in a murder case of Guptan, who was allegedly killed by a deaf and dumb woodcutter, Gabriel. Gabriel is a friend of Hari's sister and Harikrishnans become the defence lawyers upon her request.

The Harikrishnans begin an investigation and come across Meera, a friend of Guptan. Both of them fall in love with her. After some trouble over the matter, they rediscover their friendship and get involved in the case again. They discover that Guptan actually died due to poisoning by his relatives who were doctors who wanted to amass his wealth. The culprits are captured and Guptan's elderly father accepts Sudarshanan, a former student of Guptan, as his son and successor to the property.

At the end Meera decides to go for a random method of choosing her lover as she liked both Harikrishnans equally. She tosses with a leaf where the winner would be her friend and the other would marry her. The leaf fell on the name of Hari, and she presumably makes him her friend and Krishan would marry her.

Alternate ending
In the uncensored cut of the film, the leaf fell on Hari's name and she presumably marries him and Krishnan becomes her friend. There was also another ending planned with Shah Rukh Khan. He was proposed to do the role of the lover of Meera. But due to some technical problems it was cancelled.

Cast

 Mammootty as Adv. Harikrishnan / Hari 
 Mohanlal as Adv. Harikrishnan / Krishnan
 Juhi Chawla as Meera (voiced by Sreeja Ravi)
 Innocent as Adv. Sundaran
 Nedumudi Venu as Thampuran (Thirumanassu), Guptan's elderly father
 Kunchako Boban as Sudarshanan
 Shamili as Ammalu, Hari's younger sister and Krishnan's cousin
 Rajiv Menon as Guptan, Meera's friend
 Cochin Hanifa as Kunjikuttan, Meera's cousin
 V. K. Sreeraman as Gabriel, who is both deaf and dumb (gets implicated in Guptan's murder)
 Krishna as Sudarshanan's friend
 Sudheesh as Sudarshanan's Friend
 Poojappura Ravi as Ramabhadran [Ramappan], Thampuran's sinister younger cousin
 Venu Nagavalli as Kallurkaatil Vishwambharan, Meera's father
 Jagadish as Public Prosecutor
 Maniyanpilla Raju as Kunjikuttan's Advocate
 Hemanth Ravan as Dr Jaya Kumar, Ramappan's elder son and Guptan's cousin (who murdered Guptan)
 Baburaj as Prem Kumar, Ramappan's younger son and Guptan's cousin (who murdered Guptan)
 Reena as Meera's mother
 Sajitha Betti as Ammalu's friend, Nisha
 Saranya Mohan as Ammalu's Friend
 Kanakalatha as Ammalu's neighbour
 Sankaradi
 Krishna Prasad as Sudarshanan's friend
 K.P.A.C. Sunny as Judge
 V.P. Ramachandran as Ammalu's neighbour
 Augustine as Sasi, Kunjikuttan's driver
 K. P. Ummer as Sudarshanan's Hostel Warden
 Yadu Krishnan as Sudarshanan's friend
 Jereesh James as Sudarshanan's friend
 Vijayan Peringode as Temple Poojaari at Kovilakkam
 Jose Pellissery as Jose-paapa, the guard at Ammalu's neighbourhood in Ponoor
 Antony Perumbavoor as Ambulance driver Antony

Soundtrack 

K. J. Yesudas sang his parts in two different voices, to simulate the singing of both the lead actors during the song sequences in the film.

Release
Harikrishnans had multiple climaxes to appease the fan base of the lead actors Mammootty and Mohanlal. This had also caused some controversy. The scene was when Meera (Juhi Chawla) chooses one of them to be her friend among both the Harikrishnans. She admires both equally and goes for a selection method which her grandmother taught her, whenever she had to make tough decisions. She sets the method so as to choose her friend; the loser of the toss presumably becoming Mira's lover. One of the climax shots shows Hari (Mammootty) winning the toss and the other one Krishnan (Mohanlal) winning it.

However, only the Mohanlal version of the film was submitted to the Central Board of Film Certification (CBFC) and censored on 1 September 1998. Soon after the release, CBFC was quick to send a notice to the producer warning that the board would take legal action unless the uncensored alternate ending (Mammootty version) is removed from the exhibition. As a result, all the prints of Mammootty version was withdrawn from theatres and replaced with the other version.

Critical reception 
Usha Gopalakrishnan of Indolink.com gave the film 2 stars, writing: "The scenes where both Mammooty and Mohanlal compete with each other in courting Juhi are very nicely picturized. Some scenes are even funny. This is a movie that could be watched with the whole family. It is very decent (just as all the other Fazil movies). Wait for the video instead of spending money in the theater."

Box office
The film was commercial success.

References

External links
 

1990s Malayalam-language films
1990 films
Pranavam Arts International films
Films scored by Ouseppachan
Films directed by Fazil
Indian comedy thriller films